The Lovebugs are a Swiss rock band from Basel, Switzerland founded in 1992.
They are one of Switzerland's most successful bands with three number one albums in the Swiss charts.

History
Lovebugs was founded in 1992 by Adrian Sieber, Sebastian "Baschi" Hausmann and Julie Lagger, after Adrian placed an ad in a music shop: Drummer Wanted. They won a local talent contest, which enabled them to record their first album. One year later, the drummer, Julie, left the band and was replaced by Simon Ramseier.

In 1994 their first album, Fluff, was released.

In 1995 they went on their first tour which included shows around Europe. Their second album, Tart, was released the same year.

In 1996 they got their first breakthrough when their single "Fantastic" reached number 40 in the Swiss charts. They signed to BMG Ariola.

In 1998 an additional guitarist, Thomas Riechberger, joined the band.

In 2000 they had another major break-through with the album Transatlantic Flight, which reached number 3 in the Swiss album charts. It was their first release under Warner Music label. This was followed by Awaydays, which was the band's first number 1 album. The single "Music Makes My World Go Round" reached number 6. Bassist Sebastian left the band to dedicate himself to the glam-rock project 'Fucking Beautiful. He was replaced by Florian Senn. At the same time, Stefan Wagner joined the band on keyboards.

After a short break, Lovebugs were back in 2003 with the album 13 Songs With A View which contained the singles "A Love Like Tides" and "'72". The album was not as successful as the two earlier albums and only reached number 7 in the Swiss charts. The next album, Naked, was a live and unplugged album. It was their second number 1 album. It was produced by Chris von Rohr, former member of fellow Swiss band Krokus.

In 2006 another successful album that reached the top of the Swiss charts was released. It was called In Every Waking Moment and contained some Lovebugs' most popular songs, such as The Key and Avalon. The song "Avalon" featured the Norwegian singer Lene Marlin. The song reached number 10 in the Swiss charts and number 27 in the Norwegian charts.

After 2006, Lovebugs took a break, partly for recovery and partly because the singer Adrian Sieber wanted to carry out a long-planned solo career under the name Adrian Solo.

In 2009 Lovebugs were chosen to represent Switzerland at the Eurovision Song Contest in Moscow, Russia. They presented the song "The Highest Heights", but did not qualify for the finals even though they were considered favourites and were confident during the rehearsals. They ended up 14th in the first semi-final held on Tuesday, 12 May 2009, out of 18 contestants.
They had some sound problems during the Eurovision and Sieber later said in an interview that Lovebugs were primarily a live band, and weren't used to all the cameras.

At the same time, a new album, The Highest Heights, was released. The album reached 2nd place in the Swiss charts. The first single "21st Century Man" reached number 55 in Switzerland. The second single and Eurovision entry, "The Highest Heights", reached 25th in Switzerland and 57th in Sweden.

Line-up
The current line up consists of:
Adrian Sieber (vocals)
Thomas Riechberger (guitar)
Florian Senn (bass)
Stefan Wagner (keyboards, back vocals)
Simon Ramseier (drums)

Adrian Sieber writes most of the band's songs. Simon Ramseier directs the band's promo videos.

Discography

Albums
 1994: Fluff
 1995: Tart
 1996: Lovebugs (CH No. 44)
 1997: Lovebugs (Remix album)
 1999: Live via satellite - the radio X-Session
 2000: Transatlantic Flight (CH No. 3)
 2001: Awaydays (CH No. 1)
 2003: 13 Songs with a View (CH No. 7)
 2005: Naked (Unplugged) (CH No. 1)
 2006: In Every Waking Moment (CH No. 1)
 2009: The Highest Heights (CH No. 2)
 2009: Only Forever: The Best of Lovebugs (CH No. 11)
 2012: Life is Today (CH No. 2)
 2016: Land Ho! (CH No. 9)
 2018: At the Plaza (CH No. 12)

Singles
 1994: "Take Me as I Am"
 1995: "Slumber"
 1996: "Starving"
 1996: "Fantastic"
 1996: "Marilyn"
 1996: "Whirlpool"
 1996: "Fingers and Thumbs"
 1998: "Angel Heart" (CH 32)
 1999: "Under My Skin" (CH No. 17)
 2000: "Bitter Moon" (CH No. 42)
 2000: "Wall of Sound"
 2001: "Music Makes My World Go Round" (CH No. 16)
 2001: "Coffee and Cigarettes" (CH No. 46)
 2002: "Flavour of the Day" (CH No. 28)
 2003: "A Love Like Tides" (CH No. 63)
 2003: "'72"
 2005: "Everybody Knows I Love You" (Unplugged)
 2005: "When I See You Smile" (Unplugged)
 2005: "A Love Like Tides" (Unplugged)
 2006: "The Key" (CH No. 17)
 2006: "Avalon" (Featuring Lene Marlin) (CH No. 10), (NO No. 13)
 2006: "Listen to the Silence"
 2006: "Back to Life"
 2009: "21st Century Man" (CH No. 55)
 2009: "The Highest Heights" (CH No. 25), (SE No. 57)
 2009: "Shine"
 2012: "Truth Is"
 2012: "Little Boy" (featuring Søren Huss)
 2012: "Jennifer Beals"
 2012: "Fortuna!"
 2016: "Land Ho!"

See also
Adrian Sieber

References

External links
Official website
MySpace website
 laut.de
Lovebugs Fan Forum

Musical groups established in 1992
Swiss indie rock groups
Eurovision Song Contest entrants for Switzerland
Eurovision Song Contest entrants of 2009
English-language singers from Switzerland